Gerald Butler (1930–2010) was an English judge.

Gerald Butler may also refer to:

 Gerald Butler (author) (1907–1988), British author and screenwriter
 Gerald Butler (American football) (born 1954), American football wide receiver

See also
 Gerard Butler (born 1969), Scottish actor
 Jerry Butler (disambiguation)